Devil's Throat Cave, or Dyavolsko Garlo, is located in the western Rhodopes close to the village of Gyovren in Bulgaria, near its border with Greece. A popular tourist attraction, Devil's Throat branches from Trigrad Gorge.

Gallery

External links 

Tourist attractions in Smolyan Province
Landforms of Smolyan Province
Show caves in Bulgaria